Peter Hyman is a former American journalist, author and humorist who now works in the financial services sector. He is the author of The Reluctant Metrosexual: Dispatches from an Almost Hip Life, published in August 2004. A former Vanity Fair staffer and senior editor at various men's publications, he has written feature articles, critical reviews and humor pieces for The New York Times, the New York Observer, Details, Spin, Radar, the San Francisco Chronicle and various others.

Biography
His work has been collected in a number of anthologies, including The Best American Essays 2010 and Bar Mitzvah Disco. In addition to his work as a writer he was the host and producer of New York States of Mind, a monthly talk show series sponsored by the 92nd Street Y, in New York City. He was also active on the comedy and humor reading circuit in lower Manhattan. He is the co-founder of Moonshot Ventures, an e-commerce incubator which funds and manages a portfolio of web properties.

In January 2006, he published an article in Spin magazine, which broke the news regarding the cause of death of comedian Mitch Hedberg.

Hyman is a graduate of the University of Michigan and New York University, where he earned a master's degree in journalism. He resides in Brooklyn.

References

External links
 

American male journalists
American humorists
Living people
University of Michigan alumni
Journalists from New York City
Year of birth missing (living people)
New York University alumni
People from Brooklyn